Kaxda District also spelled Kahda District is a district in the southeastern Banaadir region of Somalia. It includes the northeastern neighborhoods of the national capital, Mogadishu.

References

External links

Districts of Somalia
Banaadir